The  is a type of 2-8-0 steam locomotive built by Japanese Government Railways (JGR, after-day Japanese National Railways (JNR)) from 1913. The Class 9600 was the first type of locomotive to be mass-produced by Japanese manufacturers. The Class 9600 were popularly known as Kyuroku (nine-six), and were extensively used for freight service throughout Japan.
They were numbered 9600-9699, 19600-19699, 29600-29699, 39600-39699, 49600-49699, 59600-59699, 69600-69699 and 79600-79669. All 770 remained in service until the 2nd of March 1976, when all steam-hauled service on JNR's network has been phased out.

Service outside Japan

Taiwan Railways Administration DT580
From 1923 to 1939, Kawasaki, Kisha Seizō, Nippon Sharyō, and Hitachi built 39 9600s for the Government General of Taiwan. The Taiwan Government Railway classified them 800 class before 1937, and they were classified D98 after 1937. After World War II, they were taken over by Taiwan Railways Administration, and they were classified DT580. One engine, DT619, is being rebuilt by combining parts of scrapped locomotives after the war.

China Railway class KD5/KD55
To alleviate a severe motive power shortage on the Central China Railway, JNR locomotives were converted from Japanese narrow gauge to standard gauge and shipped to China. 251 Class 9600 locomotives were sent for use on both the Central China Railway and the North China Transportation Company (NCTC class ソリコ (Soriko)); after the Pacific War, these became China Railway class KD5. Others were rebuilt to metre gauge for operation on Yunnan's Kunming–Hekou Railway and its branches; these eventually became China Railway class KD55.

Preserved examples
, 44 Class 9600 locomotives are preserved at various locations in Japan.

Number 39685, built in 1920, has been preserved outdoors in Chuo-ku, Saitama since 1972, but was removed and cut up in September 2016 due to the prohibitive cost of restoration.

See also
 Japan Railways locomotive numbering and classification
JNR Class D50 
JNR Class D51
JNR Class D52
JNR Class D60
JNR Class D61
JNR Class D62

References

Railway locomotives introduced in 1913
2-8-0 locomotives
Steam locomotives of Japan
Steam locomotives of China
Steam locomotives of Taiwan
1067 mm gauge locomotives of Japan
Standard gauge locomotives of China
Metre gauge steam locomotives
Freight locomotives